The Age of Majority (Scotland) Act 1969 (c.39) is an Act of the Parliament of the United Kingdom applicable only in Scotland. The act reduced the age of legal majority from the age of 21 (or in some cases 25), to the age of 18.

The Act affects any other Act, prior or after this Act, referring to the terms "major", "majority", "full age", "perfect age", "complete age", "lawful age", "minor", "minority", "under age", "less age". The Act also amends the age of majority for most deeds executed after the date of the Act, with exceptions for deeds created before the act created in exercise of a special power of appointment.

The Act is distinct from the Age of Legal Capacity (Scotland) Act 1991, which governs the legal capacity of minors, including when they can enter into contracts.

See also 
 Age of majority
 Capacity in Scots law
 Age of Legal Capacity (Scotland) Act 1991

References

1969 in Scotland
United Kingdom Acts of Parliament 1969
Acts of the Parliament of the United Kingdom concerning Scotland
Majority (law)
Children's rights in Scotland
Children's rights legislation
Juvenile law
Youth in Scotland
Youth rights in the United Kingdom